Senator McGraw may refer to:

Perrin H. McGraw (1822–1899), New York State Senate
Warren McGraw (born 1939), West Virginia State Senate